William George Kelly (23 November 1882 – 2 February 1961) was an Australian rules footballer who played for Fitzroy in the Victorian Football League (VFL). His son, Joe, played for Carlton and coached Footscray and South Melbourne.

References

External links

1882 births
1961 deaths
Australian rules footballers from Victoria (Australia)
Fitzroy Football Club players